The Party of Social Justice (Партия социальной справедливости, Partiya Sotsial'noy Spravedlivosti) was a political party in Russia.

At the 2003 legislative elections, the alliance of the Russian Pensioners' Party and the Social Justice Party won 3.1% of the popular vote and no seats.

On the 2007 Russian legislative election the party won 0.22% of votes, not breaking the 7% barrier, and thus no seats in Duma.

It merged into Just Russia in 2008.

Electoral results

Presidential elections

Legislative elections

External links

Political parties established in 2002
Political parties disestablished in 2008
Defunct socialist parties in Russia
2002 establishments in Russia
A Just Russia